Evanescence is the third album by Scorn, originally released in 1994 on Earache Records. It was remastered along with its remix album and released as a two disc set in 2009. Evanescence is often associated with industrial and experimental music. Nic Bullen left Scorn in 1995 and the band continued on as an essentially solo project for Mick Harris.

Track listing

Accolades

Personnel

Scorn
Nic Bullen – bass, sampler, percussion, voice, guitar
Mick Harris – drums, drum programming, sampler, percussion,

Additional musicians and production
James Plotkin – guitar
Scorn – production
Tom Smyth – engineering
Jon Wakelin – engineering

References

1994 albums
Earache Records albums
Music in Birmingham, West Midlands
Scorn (band) albums